Digital immortality (or "virtual immortality") is the hypothetical concept of storing (or transferring) a person's personality in digital substrate, i.e., a computer, robot or cyberspace (mind uploading). The result might look like an avatar behaving, reacting, and thinking like a person on the basis of that person's digital archive. After the death of the individual, this avatar could remain static or continue to learn and self-improve autonomously (possibly becoming seed AI).

A considerable portion of transhumanists and singularitarians place great hope into the belief that they may eventually become immortal by creating one or many non-biological functional copies of their brains, thereby leaving their "biological shell". These copies may then "live eternally" in a version of digital "heaven" or paradise.

Realism 
The National Science Foundation has awarded a half-million-dollar grant to the universities of Central Florida at Orlando and Illinois at Chicago to explore how researchers might use artificial intelligence, archiving, and computer imaging to create convincing, digital versions of real people, a possible first step toward virtual immortality.

The Digital Immortality Institute explores three factors necessary for digital immortality. First, at whatever level of implementation, avatars require guaranteed Internet accessibility. Next, avatars must be what users specify, and they must remain so. Finally, future representations must be secured before the living users are no more.

The aim of Dmitry Itskov's 2045 Initiative is to "create technologies enabling the transfer of an individual’s personality to a non-biological carrier, and extending existence, including to the point of immortality".

Method 
Reaching digital immortality is a two-step process:
 archiving and digitizing people,
  making the avatar live
Digital immortality has been argued to go beyond technical processes of digitization of people, and encompass social aspects as well. For example, Joshua Hurtado  has presented a four-step framework in which the digital immortalization of people could preserve the social bond between the living and the dead. These steps are: 1) data gathering, 2) data codification, 3) data activation, and 4) data embodiment. Each of these steps is linked to a form of preserving the social bond, either through talk, embodied emotionality (expressing emotions through one's form of embodiment) or monumentalism (creating a monument, in this case in digital form, to remember the dead).

Archiving and digitizing people 
According to Gordon Bell and Jim Gray from Microsoft Research, retaining every conversation that a person has ever heard is already realistic: it needs less than a terabyte of storage (for adequate quality). The speech or text recognition technologies are one of the biggest challenges of the concept.

A second possibility would be to archive and analyze social Internet use to map the personality of people. By analyzing social Internet use during 50 years, it would be possible to model a society's culture, a society's way of thinking, and a society's interests.

Rothblatt envisions the creation of "mindfiles" – collections of data from all kinds of sources, including the photos we upload to Facebook, the discussions and opinions we share on forums or blogs, and other social media interactions that reflect our life experiences and our unique self.

Richard Grandmorin summarized the concept of digital immortality by the following equation: "semantic analysis + social internet use + Artificial Intelligence = immortality".

Some find that photos, videos, soundclips, social media posts and other data of oneself could already be regarded as such an archiving.

Susanne Asche states:

Making the avatar alive 

Defining the avatar to be alive allows it to communicate with the future in the sense that it continues to learn, evolve and interact with people, if they still exist. Technically, the operation exists to implement an artificial intelligence system to the avatar. This artificial intelligence system is then assumed to think and will react on the base of the archive.

Rothblatt proposes the term "mindware" for software that is being developed with the goal of generating conscious AIs. Such software would read a person's "mindfile" to generate a "mindclone." Rothblatt also proposes a certain level of governmental approval for mindware, like an FDA certification, to ensure that the resulting mindclones are well made.

Calibration process 
During the calibration process, the biological people are living at the same time as their artifact in silicon. The artifact in silicon is calibrated to be as close as possible to the person in question.
During this process ongoing updates, synchronization, and interaction between the two minds would maintain the twin minds as one.

In fiction 

 In 1967 the short story "I Have No Mouth, and I Must Scream" written by Harlan Ellison chronicles the digitally immortal life of protagonists living within a hellscape reality.
In the TV series Caprica a digital copy of a person is created and outlives its real counterpart after the person dies in a terrorist attack.
 In Greg Egan's Permutation City people can achieve quasi digital immortality by mind uploading a digital copy of themselves into a simulated reality.
 Memories with Maya is a novel on the concept of digital immortality.
 The Silicon Man describes Cryonics as a precursor to digital immortality.
 In the 1998 novel Vast by Linda Nagata "ghosts" are recorded memories and personalities that can be transferred to another body or kept in electronic storage, granting a limited form of immortality.
 In the TV series Captain Power and the Soldiers of the Future, Overmind and Lord Dread planned to digitize all human beings to be able to create a new world.
 In the TV series Black Mirror it commonly features the themes and ethics of digital humans, called "cookies," across multiple episodes. In San Junipero, for example, people's consciences are uploaded to the cloud.
In the novel / Netflix series Altered Carbon, a person's memories and consciousness can be stored in a disk-shaped device called a cortical stack, which is implanted into the cervical vertebrae.
In Frictional Games''' SOMA, the story revolves around the problem of existing as a digital personality scan taken from a physical person.
In The Physics of Immortality: Modern Cosmology, God and the Resurrection of the Dead by Frank Tipler.
 In the 2014 film Transcendence , Will's (Johnny Depp) consciousness is uploaded into the quantum computer project he developed
In the 2015 film Chappie, a robot and a flash drive are used for consciousness transfer.
The 2020 aired TV series Upload features a narrative of the protagonist having their entire consciousness uploaded to a digital world after death.
The 2020 video game Cyberpunk 2077'' alludes to this philosophy by the protagonist becoming infected with the digitised consciousness of Johnny Silverhand, later using the same technology to overwrite Johnny or choose to allow Johnny to retain said body.

See also 
 Mind uploading
Artificial general intelligence
 
 Ship of Theseus
 Technological resurrection
 Uploaded astronaut

References 

Life extension
Transhumanism
Immortality
Hypothetical technology